Madrona Park is an  park located in the Madrona neighborhood of Seattle, Washington, bisected by Lake Washington Boulevard. It lies on the western shore of Lake Washington and features picnic areas, a swimming beach with bathhouse, and parking area. West of the campground is a tree-covered hillside and ravine featuring walking paths and Madrona Creek.

External links

Parks Department page on Madrona Park

Parks in Seattle